Mohammed Chahim is a Moroccan-born Dutch politician of the Labour Party who has been serving as a Member of the European Parliament since 2019.

Political career
Chahim has been a Member of the European Parliament since the 2019 European elections. In parliament, he has since been serving on the Committee on the Environment, Public Health and Food Safety, where he is the rapporteur for the Carbon Border Adjustment Mechanism. In 2020, he also joined the Committee of Inquiry on the Protection of Animals during Transport. 

In addition to his committee assignments, Chahim is part of the parliament's delegation for relations with India. He is also part of the European Parliament Intergroup on Climate Change, Biodiversity and Sustainable Development. 

In 2021, Chahim was part of the European Parliament’s official delegation to the United Nations Climate Change Conference (COP26).

References

External links

Living people
MEPs for the Netherlands 2019–2024
Labour Party (Netherlands) MEPs
1985 births